Girraween is an outer rural area in Darwin. It is 35 km South - East of the Darwin CBD. Its Local Government Area is the Litchfield Municipality. The suburb is mostly a rural area.

References

External links
https://web.archive.org/web/20110629040718/http://www.nt.gov.au/lands/lis/placenames/origins/greaterdarwin.shtml#l

Suburbs of Darwin, Northern Territory